Nomborn is an Ortsgemeinde – a community belonging to a Verbandsgemeinde – in the Westerwaldkreis in Rhineland-Palatinate, Germany.

Geography

The community lies in the Westerwald between Montabaur and Limburg an der Lahn on the edge of the Nassau Nature Park. Through the community flows the Eisenbach. The community belongs to the Verbandsgemeinde of Montabaur, a kind of collective municipality. Its seat is in the like-named town.

History
In 1289, Nomborn had its first documentary mention as Numburne.

Politics

Community council
The council is made up of 13 council members, including the extraofficial mayor (Bürgermeister), who were elected in a municipal election on 13 June 2004.

Coat of arms
The community's arms show a stylized representation of Saint Kilian’s Church above. The seven hexagons symbolize the basalt columns found in the area around the Hausberg Bornkasten. Below, the former drinking water supply is symbolized as a well. The wavy bendlet stands for the Eisenbach, which flows through the community.

Economy and infrastructure

The nearest Autobahn interchange is Diez on the A 3 (Cologne–Frankfurt), some 3 km away. The nearest InterCityExpress stops are the railway stations at Limburg and Montabaur, each 12 km away, on the Cologne-Frankfurt high-speed rail line, and Koblenz on the Rechte Rheinstrecke, some 40 km away.

References

External links
Nomborn 

Municipalities in Rhineland-Palatinate
Westerwaldkreis